Vohimasina Sud is a rural municipality in Madagascar. It belongs to the district of Manakara, which is a part of the region of Fitovinany. The population of the municipality was estimated to be approximately 15,000 in the 2001 commune census.

Only primary schooling is available. 93% of the population of the commune are farmers. The most important crops are soya and cloves, while other important agricultural products are coffee and sweet potatoes. Additionally, fishing employs 7% of the population.

Cyclones
In 2022 the village was hit by the Cyclone Emnati.

Roads
This municipality is linked by an unpaved provincial road to Analavory and the National road 12.

Rivers
Vohimasina Sud lies at the southern banks of the Faraony River. On the northern side is situated Vohimasina Nord.

References

Populated places in Fitovinany